Posyolok Uchastka Nagayevskogo lesnichestva is a rural locality (a settlement) in Ufa, Bashkortostan, Russia. The population was 15 as of 2010.

Geography 
The settlement is located 19 km southeast of Ufa. Zinino is the nearest rural locality.

References 

Rural localities in Ufa urban okrug